"Take It Easy on Me" is a song by Australian soft rock band Little River Band, released in March 1982 as the third and final single from the album Time Exposure. The song reached No. 10 on the U.S, becoming their 6th and last top 10 hit. Billboard Hot 100 and No. 14 on the Adult Contemporary chart. The song was written by band member Graham Goble and produced by British record producer George Martin.

Background
Two versions of this song were recorded, with Glenn Shorrock and Wayne Nelson respectively on lead vocals. "The Night Owls", with Nelson on lead, had already been selected as the first single from the album. When Martin selected the Nelson version of "Take It Easy on Me" for the album and second single, Shorrock complained and his version of the song was used instead, and released as the third single in March 1982.

Track listings
 Australian 7" (Capitol Records – CP-665)
A. "Take It Easy on Me" - 3:45
B. "Orbit Zero" - 4:28

 New Zealand 7" (Capitol Records – F 5057)
A. "Take It Easy on Me" - 3:45
B. "Orbit Zero" - 4:28

 North American 7" (Capitol Records A-5057)
A. "Take It Easy on Me" - 3:45
B. "Orbit Zero" - 4:28

Charts

Weekly charts

Year-end charts

References

1981 songs
1982 singles
Little River Band songs
Capitol Records singles
Song recordings produced by George Martin
Songs written by Graeham Goble